The following is a list of BMW automobiles and motorcycles, ordered by year of introduction.

Current production models

Cars

Motorcycles 
BMW Motorrad has produced motorcycles bearing the BMW name since the introduction of the BMW R32 in 1923. Prior to that date it produced engines for other manufacturers' motorcycles.

Present day 
 BMW F650GS & F800GS
 BMW F800R
 BMW F800S
 BMW F800ST
 BMW G310R
 BMW G310RR
 BMW G310GS
 BMW G450X
 BMW G650 Xmoto, Xchallenge, and Xcountry
 BMW R1200GS
 BMW R1200R
 BMW R1200RT
 BMW R1200S
 BMW R18
 BMW K1200LT
 BMW K1300GT
 BMW K1300R
 BMW K1300S
 BMW K1600GT and K1600GTL
 BMW S1000RR
 BMW S1000XR

Nomenclature

Three digit model names 
Beginning with the 1972 E12 5 Series, most BMW automobiles (except for the i Series, X Series and Z Series) have used a model name consisting of three numbers, usually followed by one or two letters.

In this naming system:
 The first number represents the model series
 The last two digits represent the engine displacement in deciliters (litres divided by 10).
 The letters provide additional information on the model variant.

Using the examples of the 318is, 125d and 760Li model names:
 318is means a 3 Series with a 1.8 litre engine, with the "i" meaning a fuel-injected petrol engine and the "s" meaning that sport options are fitted.
 125d means a 1 Series with a 2.5 litre engine, with the "d" meaning a diesel engine.
 760Li means a 7 Series with a 6.0 litre, with the "L" meaning a long-wheelbase model and the "i" meaning a fuel-injected petrol engine.

In Germany the model series are referred to by their German pronunciation: Einser ("One-er") for the 1 Series, Dreier ("Three-er") for the 3 Series, Fünfer ("Five-er") for the 5 Series, Sechser ("Six-er") for the 6 Series and Siebener ("Seven-er") for the 7 Series. These are not actually slang, but are the normal way that such letters and numbers are pronounced in German.

Exceptions 
There are various models where the engine size is not as implied by the last two digits, such as when a turbocharged engine is used. For example:
 From 1976 to 1986, various models using a 3.2 litre version of the M30 engine were named 533i, 633i, etc.
 Similarly, from 1987 to 1992, the models using a 3.4 litre version of the M30 engine were named 535i, 635i, etc.
 The 1982 to 1987 models using a 2.7 litre version of the M20 were called the 325e and 525e (528e in the United States).
 The 1980 to 1983 European 745i models used a turbocharged 3.2–3.4 litre engine.
 From 1994 to 1999, models using the 5.4 litre M73 engine were named 750i and 850Ci.
 Similarly, from 1996 to 1999, models using a 4.4 litre version of the M62 engine were named 540i, 740i and 840Ci. From 2001 to 2007, the situation was reversed, because models using a 4.4 litre version of the N62 engine were named 545i, 645i and 745i. Models using a 4.8 litre version of the N62 engine were named 550i, 650i and 750i.
 From 1996 to 2001, the 318i model used a 1.9 litre version of the M44 engine. Then from 2001, the 318i model used 2.0 litre engines. Since 2015, the 318i model has used a 1.5 litre turbocharged engine. 
 Since 1995, various models using a 2.5 litre six-cylinder engine have been named 323i and 523i. For the E36, E46 and E39, this was due to the previous 325i/525i models being higher in the model range than the new models, therefore a lower number was used to indicate to customers that it was not a highly equipped model.
 Similarly, from 2007 to 2013, various models using a detuned 3.0 litre six-cylinder engine have been named 125i, 128i, 325i and 528i.
 Also, several diesel models using a 3.0 litre six-cylinder engine during this time were named 125d, 325d, etc.
 The increasing use of turbochargers has resulted in the model name no longer representing the engine displacement. This began in 2005, when the N54 3.0 litre turbo petrol engine was introduced in the E92 335i model. More recent examples are a 1.5 litre turbo petrol engine being used in the 116i and 318i models, and a 3.0 litre turbo diesel engine being used in the 540d and 750d models.

Even for non-turbo engines, the number of cylinders cannot be determined from the model name. For example, the 1987–1991 530i uses a six-cylinder engine, the 1992–1996 530i uses a V8 engine and the 2000–2016 530i uses a six-cylinder engine (to add to the confusion, just prior to the 1992 V8 530i being introduced, the 535i model used a six-cylinder engine).

Letters 
The meaning of letters can change between models. The most commonly used letters are:
 d = diesel engine
 i = fuel-injected petrol engine
 L = long wheelbase – sometimes the L is the first letter (e.g. 750Li), and sometimes it is the last letter (e.g. 750iL).
 td = turbodiesel
 x / xDrive = all-wheel drive – sometimes the x is the first letter (e.g. 325xi), and sometimes it is the last letter (e.g. 325ix)

Other letters include:
 C = coupé/convertible (only used on E24, E46 and E63 models)
 e = eta (from the Greek letter 'η') a model tuned for fuel efficiency (E30 325e, G30 530e, G11 740e)
 s/S = sport, this can represent either upgraded interior/cosmetic options or increased engine power depending on the model.
 T = Touring (wagon/estate)
 t = hatchback (only used on some 3 Series Compact models)

X Series and Z Series 
Until 2009, the model name for X Series and Z Series vehicles was:
 The engine size in litres
 Followed by an "i" for petrol engines or a "d" for diesel engines
Examples of this naming convention are "X5 3.0d" and "Z3 1.8i". Sometimes an "s" was added after the engine size for higher performance models (for example, "Z4 3.0si" and "X5 4.8is").

Since 2009, a revised model naming system has been used. The model names are as follows:
 "sDrive" for rear-wheel drive or "xDrive" for all-wheel drive.
 Then the nominal engine size in litres divided by 10 (e.g. "25" for a 2.5 litre engine), although many of the anomalies described above also apply here.
 Lastly, "i" for petrol engines or "d" for diesel engines.
Examples of this naming convention are "X3 xDrive28d" and "Z4 sDrive30i". Sometimes an "s" was added at the end for higher performance models (for example, "Z4 sDrive 35is").

BMW M models of X Series and Z Series models typically just have the model name "M" (e.g. X6 M, Z4 M). "M Performance" models have the letter "M" inserted after the series, followed by the rest of the naming convention for the non-M models (e.g. X6 M50d).

M Models 
An "M' – for Motorsport – identifies the vehicle as a high-performance model of a particular series (e.g. M2, M3, M4, M5, M6, M8, etc.). For example, the M8 is the highest performing vehicle in the 8 
Series lineup.

Motorcycles

Concept vehicles

See also 

List of BMW engines
List of automobile-related articles

References 

BMW